29th parallel may refer to:

29th parallel north, a circle of latitude in the Northern Hemisphere
29th parallel south, a circle of latitude in the Southern Hemisphere